Howse is a surname. Notable people with the surname include:

 Joseph Howse (1774-1852), English explorer, linguist, and scholar
 Hilary Ewing Howse (1866–1938), American businessman and politician
 Neville Howse (1863–1930), Australian soldier and politician
 Pedro Howse (21st century), guitarist
 Stanley Howse (born 1973), American rapper and member of the Bone Thugs-n-Harmony, known as "Flesh-n-Bone".
 Steven Howse-Braxton, American rapper, younger brother of Flesh-n-Bone and affiliated member of the Bone Thugs-n-Harmony, known as "Layzie Bone".

See also
 House (disambiguation)
 Howse Pass
 Howse Peak
 Howse River
 Lindsey-Howse
 House (TV series)